Las amazonas may refer to:
 War Goddess, a 1973 adventure film, known in Spain as Las amazonas
 Las amazonas (Venezuelan TV series), 1985
 Las amazonas (Mexican TV series), 2016
 Las Amazonas District, Maynas Province, Peru